Mamberamo Raya Regency is one of the regencies (kabupaten) in Papua Province, Indonesia; it was created on 15 March 2007 from parts of Sarmi Regency and Waropen Regency. It covers an area of 23,813.91 km2, and had a population of 18,365 at the 2010 Census which had virtually doubled to 36,483 at the 2020 Census. The official estimate as at mid 2021 was 36,989. The administrative centre is at Burmeso.

Languages
Languages spoken in Mamberamo Raya Regency:

Lakes Plain languages
Burmeso language
Lower Mamberamo languages
East Geelvink Bay languages

Administrative Districts
At the 2010 Census the regency comprised eight districts (distrik), tabulated below with their areas and their populations at the 2010 Census and the 2020 Census. The table also includes the location of the district administrative centres, the number of villages (rural desa and urban kelurahan) in each district, and its post code. A ninth district (Iwaso, with its district centre at Metaweja) has recently been created, but no figures for its area or 2010 population are available.

Note: (a) includes the offshore islands of Pulau Kumkum and Pulau Poiwai. (b) Mamberamo Tengah District listed here should not be confused with Mamberamo Tengah Regency (now part of the province of Highland Papua), which lies to the southeast of Mamberamo Raya Regency. (c) the area and 2010 Population of the new Iwaso District, and the number of villages in the district, are included in the figures for Mamberamo Tengah District, from which it was cut out.

References

External links
Statistics publications from Statistics Indonesia (BPS)

Regencies of Papua (province)